"Pick the Wildwood Flower" is a song written by Joe Allen, and recorded by American country music artist Gene Watson.  It was released in June 1979 as the third single from the album Reflections.  The song reached #5 on the Billboard Hot Country Singles & Tracks chart.

Charts

Weekly charts

Year-end charts

References

1979 singles
1979 songs
Gene Watson songs
Capitol Records singles